Fifteen Twenty-One Second Avenue is a  residential skyscraper in Seattle, Washington. Designed by Weber Thompson, the 38-story tower contains 143 individual condominium homes. The building is located near the historic Pike Place Market. Construction was completed in late 2008.

References

External links
1521 Second Avenue official website

Residential buildings completed in 2008
Residential skyscrapers in Seattle